Paul Frederick Walker (July 9, 1925 – October 20, 1972) was an American football player who played one season with the New York Giants of the National Football League. He was drafted by the Detroit Lions in the tenth round of the 1945 NFL Draft. Walker played college football at Yale University and attended Oak Park and River Forest High School in Oak Park, Illinois. He was a consensus All-American in 1944.

References

External links 
Just Sports Stats

1925 births
1972 deaths
Players of American football from Missouri
American football ends
American football defensive backs
Yale Bulldogs football players
New York Giants players
All-American college football players
Sportspeople from Springfield, Missouri